Masies Artien (born 8 August 1993) is a Dutch footballer who plays as a defender for Tweede Divisie club Spakenburg.

Club career
Artien started his career with Dutch fourth tier side Argon, where he suffered consecutive relegations to the Dutch sixth tier and helped them win the 2013 KNVB Amateur Cup. In 2013, Artien signed for FC Eindhoven in the Dutch second tier, where he made three appearances. On 4 October 2013, he debuted for FC Eindhoven during a 3–2 win over FC Den Bosch.

Before the second half of 2013–14, Artien signed for Armenian club Gandzasar, but left due to payment problems. In 2014, he signed for Montfoort in the Dutch fifth tier, where he suffered relegation to the Dutch sixth tier. In 2016, Artien signed for Dutch fourth tier team Rijnsburgse Boys, helping them earn promotion to the Dutch third tier.

On 4 January 2022, Spakenburg announced that Artien had signed with the club from the 2022–23 season.

International career
Artien is eligible to represent Armenia and Iraq internationally, having been born in Iraq.

References

External links
 Masies Artien at playmakerstats.com

Living people
1993 births
Dutch people of Armenian descent
Dutch people of Iraqi descent
Sportspeople from Baghdad
Dutch footballers
Association football defenders
Eerste Divisie players
Tweede Divisie players
Derde Divisie players
FC Gandzasar Kapan players
Vierde Divisie players
Rijnsburgse Boys players
SC Genemuiden players
SV Argon players
SV Spakenburg players
FC Eindhoven players
Dutch expatriate footballers
Dutch expatriate sportspeople in Armenia
Expatriate footballers in Armenia